Aurora Arc is the ninth studio album by Japanese band Bump of Chicken, released through Toy's Factory on July 10, 2019. It debuted atop the Oricon Albums Chart, selling 202,157 copies in its first week. The lead single, "Aria", was released in mid-2016.

Several of the tracks were used as theme songs for anime series; "Gekkou" was used as the first opening theme of Karakuri Circus, while "Sirius" was used as the opening of the anime Juushinki Pandora, with "Spica" being used as its ending theme. The band embarked on the Aurora Ark tour in support of the album from July to November 2019.

Background
Eleven of the tracks were released prior to the album, with nine issued as singles from August 2016 to March 2019; the previously unreleased tracks are "Aurora Arc", "Junglegym" and "Nagareboshi no Shoutai".

Cover art
The cover art is a photo of the aurora borealis taken in Yellowknife, Canada, by the photographer Yoshiharu Ota, who collaborated with visual designer Verdy on the sleeve.

Track listing

Charts

Weekly charts

Year-end charts

Certifications

References

2019 albums
Bump of Chicken albums
Japanese-language albums